Leucadendron rourkei, the Uniondale conebush, is a flower-bearing shrub belonging to the genus Leucadendron and forms part of the fynbos. The plant is native to the Western Cape and Eastern Cape, South Africa. The plant is rare.

Description

The plant dies after a fire but the seeds survive. The seeds are stored in a toll on the female plant and fall to the ground after a fire, possibly spreading by the wind. The plant is unisexual and there are separate plants with male and female flowers, which are pollinated by the wind.

The tree's national number is 81.6.

Distribution and habitat
The plant occurs in the Kammanassie Mountains, Kouga Mountains, and eastern Swartberg.

Gallery

References

http://redlist.sanbi.org/species.php?species=794-114
http://biodiversityexplorer.info/plants/proteaceae/leucadendron_rourkei.htm
https://www.proteaatlas.org.za/conebu.htm

rourkei